Rummy is a 2014 Indian Tamil-language romantic comedy drama film co-produced and directed by debutant Balakrishnan .K. It features Vijay Sethupathi, Inigo Prabhakar, Aishwarya Rajesh, Gayathrie Shankar, Soori and Joe Malloori. The music was composed by D. Imman with editing by Raja Mohammad and cinematography by C. Premkumar. The story revolves around college students, Sakthi and Joseph, fall in love with girls of the same family. When the family learns about the love affairs, they are ready to go to any length to save their honour.

The film was shot around Pudukottai, Karaikudi and Thanjavur.

Rummy released on 31 January 2014 to moderate reviews.

Plot
Sakthi attends a college in Sivagangai, where he meets classmates Joseph and Meenakshi. Sakthi and Joseph are roommates and are very close. Meanwhile, Sakthi falls in love with Meenakshi, who happens to be the daughter of Periyavar, the headman of a nearby village. Periyavar and his family are practitioners of casteism to the extent of killing anyone involved in an inter-caste marriage. Meenakshi fears her father would kill Sakthi if he found out about her relationship with him. Sakthi and Joseph are expelled from the college hostel following a fight with another classmate, after which they go to Meenakshi’s. Joseph meets Swarna in the village and develops a liking for which is reciprocated. It is revealed that Swarna is actually Meenakshi's elder sister. Periyavar finds about Swarna’s love affair and makes plans to kill Joseph.

However, Joseph and Swarna elope from the village and get married with the help of Sakthi and Meenakshi. Periyavar’s henchmen track them down and beat up Joseph. In the process, Joseph is killed, and Swarna is taken back to her village and locked up in a room. In the meantime, Periyavar discovers Meenakshi's love affair and makes plans to kill Sakthi. An angered Swarna kills Periyavar with a sickle before he can kill Sakthi, effectively ending Periyavar’s honor killing practice. Sakthi and Meenakshi areunited at the end.

Cast 

 Vijay Sethupathi as Joseph, Sakthi's friend
 Inigo Prabhakar as Sakthi, Joseph's friend
 Aishwarya Rajesh as Sornam, Joseph's love interest
 Gayathrie Shankar as Meenakshi, Sakthi's love interest
 Soori as Arunachalam
 Joe Malloori as Periyavar, Sorna and Meenakshi's father
 Sentrayan as Sakthi's friend
 Sujatha Sivakumar as Sakthi's mother
 Saran Shakthi as Sorna's brother
 Tiger Garden Thangadurai
 L. Raja as Sakthi's father
 Munnar Ramesh as Sornam's uncle

Production 
In December 2012, Vijay Sethupathi signed up a project for debutant K. Balakrishnan, former assistant of N. Linguswamy who impressed him with his script. The film is said to be set in the 1980s. According to sources, Rummy is a dark romantic thriller. The first look was released on 4 October 2013. While it was reported that actress Remya Nambeesan, a trained classical singer, would be making her Tamil singing debut with this film, the song apparently doesn't appear in the soundtrack. Contrary to popular thought, Inigo Prabhakar plays the male lead role although the film was marketed as a Vijay Sethupathi film.

Music 

The soundtrack album was composed by D. Imman to the lyrics penned by Yugabharathi. The audio rights were bought by Sony Music. The album was released by Kamal Haasan.

Track list
From Times of India.

Release 
The satellite rights of the film were secured by Zee Tamil. The film was supposed to release on 31 December 2013, but due to the presence of many big films it was postponed and released on 31 January 2014.

Reception
The film received mixed to negative reviews.

Baradwaj Rangan wrote, "We keep waiting for something to happen and throw these aimless scenes into sharp relief. We await a twist in the tale. But there’s nothing...It’s a testament to the power of melodrama that the story turns mildly interesting in its final section, but the ending isn’t earned. It appears tacked on simply so that we leave the theatre on an emotional high — and that’s the worst kind of cheating". The Times of India gave 2.5 stars out of 5 and wrote, "While it is, on the whole, a decent film, especially in the set-in-the-sickle-toting-south genre, Rummy is also wearisome, mainly because it is so predictable. There is a strong been-there-done-that whiff in the proceedings that you are hardly surprised and never really root for the characters". Sify wrote, "K. Balakrishnan makes a decent debut with Rummy, but it is predictable and at times the pace sags. As usual first half is decent, while the story loses its steam post-interval".

Rediff gave 2.5 stars out of 5 and called Rummy "an engaging film, let down by an average screenplay and the extremely slow pace". The Hindustan Times gave 2.5 stars out of 5 and wrote, "Rummy is often violent...There is more bloodshed and gore to come, more revenge and brutality -- sometimes treated with arrogant casualness. However, the high point of Balakrishnan's script is the shock it presents at the end". Behindwoods gave 2 stars out of 5 and called it "A familiar tale of oppositions to love which takes its own sweet time to move".

References

External links
 

2014 films
2010s Tamil-language films
Indian romantic thriller films
Films scored by D. Imman
Films set in 1980
2014 directorial debut films
2010s romantic thriller films